Dayahatyn (also spelled Dayakhatyn or Daya-khatyn or Bai Khatyn in folk) is a medieval caravanserai, sitting on the left bank of the Amu Darya. It is around 170 km to the northwest of the modern city of Turkmenabat, Lebap welaýaty, near the border between Turkmenistan and Uzbekistan. It is a fortified square enclosure with sides 53 metres long. It is believed to have been originally a fortress built by Tahir ibn Husayn in the 9th century. In the 11th century, it was transformed into a caravanserai with fascinating brick-structures, providing shelter for not only caravans but also elites during their long journeys. The integrity of Dayahatyn is a typical example of the mastery of Seljuk architects in brickwork during the 11th and 12th centuries. Because of its artistic excellence, Dayahatyn is regarded as one of the most valuable examples, and perhaps the finest example, of caravanserai structure extant in Central Asia.

History

Folklore 
Several legends relate the construction of Dayahatyn. One is that the Rabat of Dayahatyn was built by a local ruler, who wished to hide from a beauty named Daya. Another version is about a rich man named Bay, who suspected his wife in infidelity and left home in the cloth of poor dervish. His wife Bay-Hatyn waited for him to return for many years. In order to ease his suspicion, she built the beautiful Dayahatyn to demonstrate her love and fidelity to her husband. After years of wandering, Bay finally returned to his homeland as a worker in the caravanserai construction. Bay-Hatyn recognized him and they lived happily ever after.

Conservation 

The site has been recommended by the Government of Turkmenistan for inclusion in the UNESCO World Heritage List. In 2012, Dayahatyn was awarded a conservation grant from the Ambassadors Fund for Cultural Preservation by the U.S. Government; the National Administration for Protection, Research and Restoration of Historical and Cultural Monuments of Turkmenistan undertook the responsibilities.

Tourism 

As Dayahatyn is located far from common tourist routes and movements of foreign visitors are still monitored by an extremely authoritarian government, tourism development conditions of Dayahatyn are not very favourable. Very few tourists are able visit, although since 2018 the caravansarai is no longer behind the border fence. In order to develop tourism, the Dayahatyn caravanserai is included in the Programme for Tourism Industry Development in Turkmenistan in 2012–2016. Within this programme, improvement of tourism development in Dayahatyn could be carried out in the near future.

See also 

 Caravanserai
 Rabati Malik

References 

Caravanserais
Central Asia
Turkmenistan–Uzbekistan border
Archaeological sites in Turkmenistan